The Land of Karrus (or Land of Karrus) is a closed-end, computer moderated play-by-mail (PBM) game. It was published by Paper Tigers of Glendora, CA.

History and development
Jean Brown designed Land of Karrus, with Wesley J. Peters as the programmer. Play began in 1990. The game was a computer-moderated, closed end, role-playing PBM game. It had both science fiction and fantasy elements. The publisher, Paper Tigers, also produced a game newsletter called Karrutian Kapsule. By 1996, the publisher was Fallen Angel PBM.

Gameplay
The Land of Karrus is played on the planet of Karrus. Exploration, economics, and combat were elements of gameplay. Players roleplayed groups from three available races, the Utarians, Karrutians, and the Heqi. 

The game's goal was to become Wise, and the game featured Quests for Wisdom. Wisdom levels range from one to seven.

Reception
Stewart Wieck reviewed the game in the December 1990 – January 1991 issue of White Wolf magazine. Out of a possible 5, he rated it a 2 for Strategy, 3 for game Materials, and 4 for Moderation and Diplomacy. Hi overall rating was a 3 of 5.

See also
 List of play-by-mail games

References

Bibliography

Further reading
 
 
 
 
 

Multiplayer games
Play-by-mail games